Newburgh Point is the northwest point of Lavoisier Island, Biscoe Islands. Mapped from air photos taken by Falkland Islands and Dependencies Aerial Survey Expedition (FIDASE) (1958–59). Named by United Kingdom Antarctic Place-Names Committee (UK-APC) after Louis H. Newburgh (1883–1956), American physiologist who specialized in the physiology of heat regulation and clothing for cold environments.

Headlands of the Biscoe Islands